The governor of Georgia is the head of government of Georgia and the commander-in-chief of the state's military forces. The current officeholder is Republican Brian Kemp, who assumed office on January 14, 2019.

There have officially been 77 governors of the State of Georgia, including 11 who served more than one distinct term (John Houstoun, George Walton, Edward Telfair, George Mathews, Jared Irwin, David Brydie Mitchell, George Rockingham Gilmer, M. Hoke Smith, Joseph Mackey Brown, John M. Slaton and Eugene Talmadge, with Herman Talmadge serving two de facto distinct terms).

The longest-serving governors are George Busbee, Joe Frank Harris, Zell Miller, Sonny Perdue and Nathan Deal, each of whom served two full four-year terms; Joseph E. Brown, governor during the Civil War, was elected four times, serving seven and a half years. The shortest term of the post-revolutionary period is that of Matthew Talbot, who served 13 days after succeeding his predecessor who died in office. Eugene Talmadge died in December 1946 before taking office in his second distinct term, leading to a dispute in which three people claimed the office.

Governors

Georgia was one of the original Thirteen Colonies and was admitted as a state on January 2, 1788. Before it declared its independence, Georgia was a colony of the Kingdom of Great Britain.

The Rules and Regulations of the Colony, drafted in 1776, provided for a president to serve a term of 6 months. A formal constitution was drafted in 1777, providing for a governor to serve a term of one year, but no more than one year out of every three. The term was lengthened to two years in 1789, but with no term limit. The 1865 constitution required governors to take four years off after serving two terms, but that was quickly changed in the 1868 constitution, which allowed for four-year terms with no limits. The term length was returned to the two-year term and limit of the 1865 constitution in 1877.

The 1945 constitution changed the length of terms to four years, with governors required to take four years off before running again, and it created the office of lieutenant governor, who would exercise the powers of the governor should the office become vacant. This was changed in 1983 so that the lieutenant governor fully becomes governor in that circumstance. Before the creation of the office of lieutenant governor, the president of the senate (or, before 1789, the president of the executive council) would exercise the powers of governor. The 1983 constitution also allows governors to succeed themselves once, before having to wait four years to run again.

See also
Gubernatorial lines of succession in the United States#Georgia
First ladies of Georgia

Notes

References

General

 
 
 A History of Georgia, second ed.  Kenneth Coleman, general editor.  University of Georgia Press: 1991.

Constitutions

Specific

Lists of state governors of the United States

Governors